Fwe or FWE may refer to:
 Fwe language

 Family-wise error rate
 Family Wrestling Entertainment
  (FWE), renamed to VEB Mikroelektronik "Karl-Marx" Erfurt (MME) in 1983, a microelectronic design and development facility in the former East Germany

 "Finished With Engines" Command on ship's wheelhouse/engine-room telegraph.